Hermann Palka (21 March 1921 – 9 March 2004) was an Austrian bobsledder who competed in the early 1950s. At the 1952 Winter Olympics in Oslo, he finished fifth in the four-man event. He was born in Schottwien in 1921, and died in Wiener Neustadt in 2004.

References
1952 bobsleigh four-man results
Bobsleigh four-man result: 1948-64

External links
 

Austrian male bobsledders
Bobsledders at the 1952 Winter Olympics
1921 births
2004 deaths